Lake Newell is a large man-made reservoir in southern Alberta, Canada. The reservoir was filled in 1914 through the construction of the Bassano Dam. It was named after T.H. Newell, a landowner and irrigation expert. The County of Newell is in turn named after the lake.

The lake adjoins two man made wetlands: Kinbrook Marsh North and Kinbrook Marsh South.

It empties into the Bow River after flowing through Rolling Hills Lake, an extension of the lake, filled when the dam was raised in 1939. Irrigation canals are built between the lake and the Bow River, as well as in the agricultural area north and east of the lake. Kinbrook Island Provincial Park was established in the eastern shore of the lake on November 14, 1951.

See also
Lakes of Alberta
Lake Newell Resort, Alberta

References

Lakes of Alberta
County of Newell
Reservoirs in Alberta